The 1952 State of the Union Address was given by Harry S. Truman, the 33rd president of the United States, on Wednesday, January 9, 1952.  It was given to both houses of the 82nd United States Congress at the same time.  In it, he said these words: "If the Soviet leaders were to accept this proposal, it would lighten the burden of armaments, and permit the resources of the earth to be devoted to the good of mankind. But until the Soviet Union accepts a sound disarmament proposal, and joins in peaceful settlements, we have no choice except to build up our defenses."

See also
1952 United States presidential election

References

External links 
 1952 State of the Union Address (video) at C-SPAN

Presidency of Harry S. Truman
State of the Union addresses
82nd United States Congress
State of the Union Address
State of the Union Address
State of the Union Address
State of the Union Address
January 1952 events in the United States